The Fugitive Slave Clause in the United States Constitution, also known as either the Slave Clause or the Fugitives From Labor Clause, is Article IV, Section 2, Clause 3, which requires a "person held to service or labor" (usually a slave, apprentice, or indentured servant) who flees to another state to be returned to their master in the state from which that person escaped. The enactment of the Thirteenth Amendment to the United States Constitution, which abolished slavery except as a punishment for criminal acts, has made the clause mostly irrelevant.

Text
The text of the Fugitive Slave Clause is:

As in the other references in the Constitution dealing with slavery, the words "slave" and "slavery" are not specifically used in this clause. Historian Donald Fehrenbacher believes that throughout the Constitution there was the intent to make it clear that slavery existed only under state law, not federal law. On this instance, Fehrenbacher concludes:

Background

Prior to the American Revolution, there were no generally accepted principles of international law that required sovereign states to return fugitive slaves that had fled to their territory. English court decisions and opinions came down on both sides of the issue.

The ambiguity was resolved with the Somerset v Stewart decision in 1772. Lord Mansfield ordered that a fugitive slave from Massachusetts who had reached England, where slavery was not a legally recognised status (although not positively prohibited until the Slavery Abolition Act 1833) was a free person who could not be legally returned to his previous owners. Absent a long-standing local custom or positive legislation requiring the return, judges were bound by English law to ignore the prior legal status of the fugitive under foreign laws. Although the decision did not affect the colonies directly and despite a general record of cooperation by northern colonies, law professor Steven Lubet wrote:

During and after the American Revolutionary War under the Articles of Confederation, there was no way to compel free states to capture fugitive slaves from other states and return them to their former masters, although there were provisions for the extradition of criminals. Despite this, there was not a widespread belief that this was a problem or that Northern states failed to cooperate on the issue. This was due at least in part to the fact that by 1787 only Vermont and Massachusetts had outlawed or effectively outlawed slavery.

At the Constitutional Convention, many slavery issues were debated and for a time slavery was a major impediment to passage of the new constitution. However, there was little discussion concerning the issue of fugitive slaves. After the Three-Fifths Compromise resolved the issue of how to count slaves in the distribution of taxes and the apportionment of the members of the United States House of Representatives, two South Carolina delegates, Charles Pinckney and Pierce Butler, on August 28, 1787, proposed that fugitive slaves should be "delivered up like criminals". James Wilson of Pennsylvania and Roger Sherman of Connecticut originally objected. Wilson argued that the provision "would oblige the Executive of the State to do it at public expence", while Sherman stated that he "saw no more propriety in the public seizing and surrendering a slave or servant, than a horse". After these objections, the discussion was dropped.

The next day Butler proposed the following language which was passed with no debate or objections.

Afterwards, the Convention's Committee on Style formed a digest of the plan, to which many of the delegates later sought to have the word "legally" struck out, fearing this might favor the idea that "slavery was legal in a moral view".

Legacy
When South Carolina seceded from the Union in late 1860, its secession convention issued the Declaration of the Immediate Causes Which Induce and Justify the Secession of South Carolina from the Federal Union. The declaration placed heavy emphasis on the importance of the Fugitive Slave Clause to South Carolina and accused Northern states of flagrantly violating it, going as far as naming specific states.

Unlike the U.S. Constitution, the Constitution of the Confederate States mentioned slavery by name and specified African-Americans as the subject. It contained a much more rigid form of the Fugitive Slave Clause.

In 1864, during the Civil War, an effort to repeal this clause of the Constitution failed. The subsequent passage of the Thirteenth Amendment to the United States Constitution abolished slavery "except as a punishment for crime," rendering the clause mostly moot. However, it has been noted in connection with the Fugitive Slave Clause that people can still be held to service or labor under limited circumstances; the U.S. Supreme Court stated in United States v. Kozminski, 487 U.S. 931, 943 (1988) that "not all situations in which labor is compelled by physical coercion or force of law violate the Thirteenth Amendment."

See also
Fugitive slave laws
Slave Trade Acts

References

Bibliography
Amar, Akhil Reed. America's Constitution: A Biography. (2005) .
Fehrenbacher, Don E. The Slaveholding Republic: An Account of the United States Government's Relations to Slavery. (2001) .
Finkelman, Paul. "The Kidnapping of John Davis and the Adoption of the Fugitive Slave Law of 1793". The Journal of Southern History, (Vol. LVI, No.3, August 1990).
Goldstone, Lawrence. Dark Bargain: Slavery, Profits, and the Struggle for the Constitution. (2005) .
Lubet, Steven. Fugitive Justice: Runaways, Rescuers, and Slavery on Trial. (2010) .
Madison, James. "Notes of Debates in the Federal Convention of 1787." http://avalon.law.yale.edu/subject_menus/debcont.asp

External links
List of popular names of sections and clauses of the US Constitution

Article Four of the United States Constitution
Clauses of the United States Constitution
Indentured servitude in the Americas
Slavery in the United States